Alytes maurus (common name: Moroccan midwife toad) is a species of frog in the family Alytidae (formerly Discoglossidae).
It is endemic to Morocco.
Its natural habitats are temperate forests, Mediterranean-type shrubby vegetation, rivers, freshwater marshes, freshwater springs, rocky areas, and rural gardens.
Phenomena such as habitat fragmentation, water pollution, climate change, and the introduction of chytrid fungus into ecosystems all pose threats to the well-being of these organisms.

Sources
 Lee Dietterich. 2011. Alytes maurus. ed. B. Zimkus. African Amphibians 
 Escoriza, D., Ben Hassine, J. 2019. Amphibians of North Africa. Elsevier, London.
 de Pous, P., Metallinou, M., Donaire-Barroso, D., Carranza, S., & Sanuy, D. 2013. Integrating mtDNA analyses and ecological niche modelling to infer the evolutionary history of Alytes maurus
(Amphibia; Alytidae) from Morocco

References

Alytes
Endemic fauna of Morocco
Amphibians described in 1962
Taxonomy articles created by Polbot